Illumination is the fifth full-length album by the Norwegian band Tristania. It is the last album to feature Vibeke Stene on vocals, Rune Østerhus on bass, Svein Terje Solvang on guitar, and Kenneth Olsson on drums. This is also the final album to feature Østen Bergøy as an official member of the band, although he performed some vocal work on the band's next studio album as a session member.

Track listing

Charts

Personnel

Tristania
 Vibeke Stene – Vocals
 Østen Bergøy – Vocals
 Anders Høyvik Hidle – Guitars
 Einar Moen – Synths & Programming
 Svein Terje Solvang – Guitars, Vocals on "In the Wake"
 Rune Østerhus – Bass
 Kenneth Olsson – Drums

Session Members
 Vorph – harsh vocals on "Mercyside", "The Ravens" & "In The Wake"
 Petra Stalz – violin
 Heike Haushalter – violin
 Monika Malek – viola
 Gesa Hangen – cello

Production
 Produced by Waldemar Sorychta
 Recorded & engineered by Waldemar Sorychta, Siggi Bemm, Dennis Koehne
 Mixed by Waldemar Sorychta

References

External links
 
 "Illumination" at Discogs

2007 albums
Tristania (band) albums
SPV/Steamhammer albums
Albums produced by Waldemar Sorychta